Complement C4-A is a kind of the Complement component 4 protein that in humans is encoded by the C4A gene.

Function 

This gene encodes the acidic form of complement factor 4, part of the classical activation pathway. The protein is expressed as a single chain precursor which is proteolytically cleaved into a trimer of alpha, beta, and gamma chains prior to secretion. The trimer provides a surface for interaction between the antigen-antibody complex and other complement components. The alpha chain may be cleaved to release C4 anaphylatoxin, a mediator of local inflammation. Deficiency of this protein is associated with systemic lupus erythematosus and type I diabetes mellitus. Excess production due to a copy number that is higher than normal has shown a high probability of a causal relationship with schizophrenia and bipolar disorder with psychosis, which could explain the hereditary nature of these illnesses. This gene localizes to the RCCX locus within the major histocompatibility complex (MHC) class III region on chromosome 6. Varying haplotypes of this gene cluster exist, such that individuals may have 1, 2, or 3 copies of this gene. Each copy of the gene, due to five adjacent nucleotide substitutions cause four amino acid changes and immunological subfunctionalization, can be of one of two types: C4A and C4B. Each gene contains 41 exons and has a dichotomous size variation between approximately 22 kb and 16 kb, with the longer variant being the result of the integration of the endogenous retrovirus HERV-K(C4) into intron 9.

See also 
 Complement component 4
 Complement component 4B
 HLA A1-B8-DR3-DQ2 haplotype
 Complement system
 Complement deficiency

References

Further reading

External links
 
 

Transfusion medicine
Blood antigen systems
Complement system